The Mount Whyte Formation is a stratigraphic unit that is present on the western edge of the Western Canada Sedimentary Basin in the southern Canadian Rockies and the adjacent southwestern Alberta plains. It was deposited during Middle Cambrian time and consists of shale interbedded with other siliciclastic rock types and limestones. It was named for Mount Whyte in Banff National Park by Charles Doolittle Walcott, the discoverer of the Burgess shale fossils, and it includes several genera of fossil trilobites.

Lithology and deposition
The Mount Whyte Formation was deposited during Middle Cambrian time in shallow water at the western margin of the North American Craton. It consists mainly of shale interbedded with other siliciclastic rock types and limestone. In the Mount Whyte area it can be subdivided into three units:

Upper member: Shale interbedded with oolitic limestone.
Middle member: Shale with thin beds of sandstones and conglomerates, grading into impure limestones at the top.
Basal member: Thin-bedded limestones and sandy limestones with lenticular beds of pebbly sandstone and shale partings.

Distribution and stratigraphic relationships
The Mount Whyte Formation outcrops in the southern Rocky Mountains of southwestern Alberta and southeastern British Columbia, and is present in the subsurface beneath the southwestern Alberta plains where it grades onto the Earlie Formation. It grades into the Snake Indian Formation to the north and Naiset Formation to the west. It disconformably overlies the Lower Cambrian Gog Group and is conformably overlain by the Cathedral Formation.

Paleontology
The Mount Whyte Formation includes Olenellus and other fossil trilobites that establish its Middle Cambrian age by biostratigraphy.

See also

 List of fossiliferous stratigraphic units in British Columbia

References

References
 

Cambrian System of North America
Geologic formations of Alberta
Geologic formations of Canada
Western Canadian Sedimentary Basin
Stratigraphy of British Columbia
Cambrian Alberta
Cambrian British Columbia
Cambrian southern paleotropical deposits